The 2013 UniCredit Czech Open was a professional tennis tournament played on clay courts. It was the 20th edition of the tournament which was part of the 2013 ATP Challenger Tour. It took place in Prostějov, Czech Republic between 3 and 9 June 2013.

Singles main draw entrants

Seeds

 1 Rankings are as of May 27, 2013.

Other entrants
The following players received wildcards into the singles main draw:
  Florian Mayer
  Jarkko Nieminen
  Lukáš Rosol
  Radek Štěpánek

The following player received entry using a protected ranking:
  Víctor Estrella

The following players received entry as alternates into the singles main draw:
  Damir Džumhur
  Dušan Lojda
  Jordi Samper-Montaña
  Marek Semjan

The following players received entry from the qualifying draw:
  Miloslav Mečíř Jr.
  Mateusz Kowalczyk
  Ivo Minář
  Jaroslav Pospíšil

The following player received entry as a lucky loser:
  Michal Konečný

Doubles main draw entrants

Seeds

1 Rankings as of May 27, 2013.

Other entrants
The following pairs received wildcards into the doubles main draw:
  Marek Jaloviec /  Václav Šafránek
  Michal Konečný /  Adam Pavlásek
  Jaroslav Levinský /  Dušan Lojda

The following pair received entry as an alternate:
  Dominik Kellovský /  Robert Rumler

Champions

Singles

 Radek Štěpánek def.  Jiří Veselý, 6–4, 6–2

Doubles

 Nicholas Monroe /  Simon Stadler def.  Mateusz Kowalczyk /  Lukáš Rosol, 6–4, 6–4

External links
 Official website

UniCredit Czech Open
Czech Open (tennis)
2013 in Czech tennis
June 2013 sports events in Europe